Richard Abruzzo (May 19, 1963 – c. September 29, 2010) was a champion American balloonist who with Carol Rymer Davis won the 2003 America's Challenge Gas Balloon Race and the 2004 Gordon Bennett Cup.

Background
Abruzzo was born on May 19, 1963 to Ben Abruzzo and Patricia Ann "Pat" Steen Abruzzo.  In his home town of Albuquerque, New Mexico his business enterprises included real estate and ski lifts. The ballooning accomplishments of his father Ben, who was part of the balloon crews to first cross the Atlantic ocean in the Double Eagle II and the Pacific ocean in the Double Eagle V, encouraged Richard's lifetime of balloon accomplishments. In 1992 Richard flew the first gas balloon from North America to Africa breaking the distance record previously held by his father. He was a five time champion in the America's Challenge Gas Balloon Race winning in 1995, 1997, 2002, 2003, and 2004.   The National Aeronautic Association awarded Richard Abruzzo the Harmon Trophy as the year's outstanding aeronaut in 2001, 2003, and 2005. The 2001 Harmon Trophy was for the longest solo flight from Albuquerque, New Mexico to Crawfordville, Georgia. The 2003 Harmon Trophy was for the first solo gas balloon transcontinental flight from San Diego to the Georgia coast.

Disappearance and death
Richard Abruzzo and Rymer Davis were lost at sea on September 29, 2010 while competing in the 54th Gordon Bennett Cup. Five days after liftoff from Bristol, England they encountered a severe thunderstorm and were lost at sea. Their bodies were found off the coast of Italy in the Adriatic Sea on December 6, 2010.

See also
List of people who disappeared mysteriously at sea

References

External links

"A picture of Richard Abruzzo and his wife Nancy in Bristol, England, on 25 September 2010, before the launch of the Gordon Bennett international balloon race." George Bladon/nrgsportspix.com
"Inquiry into missing gas balloonists expected", BBC, October 2, 2010

1963 births
2004 in aviation
2010 deaths
2010s missing person cases
American aviation record holders
American balloonists
Aviation history of the United States
Aviators from New Mexico
Aviators killed in aviation accidents or incidents in Italy
Balloon flight record holders
Formerly missing people
Harmon Trophy winners
Missing person cases in Italy
People from Albuquerque, New Mexico
People lost at sea
People who died at sea
Victims of aviation accidents or incidents in 2010